Louise Droste-Roggemann (20 October 1865 – 30 December 1945) was a German painter.

Life 
Droste-Roggemann completed school in Bad Zwischenahn where she excelled in drawing. She lived with her parents and siblings in a house on Bahnhofstraße. The house was demolished many years ago and today there is an old people's home on the property where Drose-Roggemann's parents used to live.

After finishing school, Droste-Roggemann decided to become an artist. She was able to finance her education and other trips from an inheritance. Around 1890, she left her parents' home and travelled to Weimar and Dresden. Both cities had art academies, whose teachers gave private painting and drawing lessons as an additional source of income. Since women were not yet admitted to art academies, private classes were the only available option for Droste-Roggemann. She probably lived in Dresden between 1890 and 1891, where she became acquainted with the Oldenburg painter Bernhard Winter, who went to the Kunstakademie Dresden in 1887 and studied painting there until 1891. Until 1900 Droste-Roggemann undertook many study trips, on which she created oil paintings and pencil sketches. She created many pencil sketches with location details of her excursions to the mountains in Scandinavian countries.

Droste-Roggemann lived in Bad Zwischenahn from 1901, and became acquainted with the merchant Oskar Droste (1851–1941) from Bremen who had taken over a peat factory in the village. They married in 1902 and Louise took the surname Droste-Roggemann. In 1904 a daughter was born, their only child. Since her return to Bad Zwischenahn, the artist took every opportunity to paint from nature.

Gallery

Sources 
 Heinrich Poppe und Horst Wichmann: Neues Dötlinger Dorfbuch. 
 Nils Aschenbeck: Künstlerkolonie Dötlingen. 
 Jürgen Derschewsky: Oldenburger Künstler. Nordwest-Zeitung Dezember 2008

External links 
Biographies Oldenburg artists

German women painters
1865 births
1945 deaths